Ailton Machado de Souza Rosa (born 17 April 1994), commonly known as Ailton, is a Brazilian footballer who plays as midfielder for Samut Sakhon City in the Thai League 3.

Career statistics

Club

Notes

References

1994 births
Living people
Brazilian expatriate footballers
Association football midfielders
Segunda División B players
Thai League 2 players
Thai League 3 players
São Paulo FC players
Quissamã Futebol Clube players
Esporte Clube Passo Fundo players
Clube Náutico Marcílio Dias players
Santos FC players
CP Cacereño players
Desportivo Brasil players
Comunicaciones F.C. players
CR Vasco da Gama players
Nova Iguaçu Futebol Clube players
Irodotos FC players
Al-Mujazzal Club players
Oman Club players
Muangkan United F.C. players
Kasetsart F.C. players
Sheikh Russel KC players
Samut Sakhon F.C. players
Brazilian expatriate sportspeople in Spain
Expatriate footballers in Spain
Brazilian expatriate sportspeople in Guatemala
Expatriate footballers in Guatemala
Brazilian expatriate sportspeople in Greece
Expatriate footballers in Greece
Brazilian expatriate sportspeople in Saudi Arabia
Expatriate footballers in Saudi Arabia
Brazilian expatriate sportspeople in Oman
Expatriate footballers in Oman
Brazilian expatriate sportspeople in Thailand
Expatriate footballers in Thailand
Footballers from Rio de Janeiro (city)
Brazilian footballers